Məhərrəmli (also, Magerramli) is a village and municipality in the Kurdamir Rayon of Azerbaijan. The closest major cities include Baku, Ardabīl, Tabrīz and Makhachkala.

References 

Populated places in Kurdamir District